EMI Televisa Music or Televisa EMI Music was a record label established in 2005 as a partnership between EMI Latin and Televisa. It focused on Latin American music. The joint venture between the two ended in 2009.

Artists signed to this label 

A.B. Quintanilla III presents Kumbia All Starz 
Alejandra Guzmán 
Aleks Syntek
Alexandre Pires 
Amaral 
Ana Gabriel 
Anahí 
Andy Andy 
Arthur Hanlon 
Bebe 
Belinda
Bunbury
Cabas 
Carlos Vives 
Chetes
Chicos de Barrio 
DJ Kane 
Diego González
Eiza González 
Flex 
Fonseca 
Héroes del Silencio 
Intocable 
JD Natasha 
Jerry Rivera 
Juan Luis Guerra 
La Nueva Banda Timbiriche 
Lucero 
Myriam Montemayor Cruz 
Miranda! 
Moenia 
Noelia 
Obie Bermúdez 
Plastilina Mosh 
Pepe Aguilar 
Pee Wee
Raphael 
RBD 
Ricardo Montaner 
Selena 
Shaila Dúrcal 
Thalía (1994-2008)
Timbiriche 
Tiziano Ferro 
Tito El Bambino 
Tony Touch 
Vicente Garcia
Vico C

References

External links 
 EMI Televisa website

Latin American music record labels
Televisa
EMI
2005 establishments in North America
2009 disestablishments in North America
Record labels established in 2005
Record labels disestablished in 2009